The members of the fourteenth National Assembly of South Korea were elected on 24 March 1992. The Assembly sat from 30 May 1992 until 29 May 1996.

Members

Seoul

Busan

Daegu

Incheon

Gwangju

Daejeon

Gyeonggi

Gangwon

North Chungcheong

South Chungcheong

North Jeolla

South Jeolla

North Gyeongsang

South Gyeongsang

Jeju

Proportional representation

Notes

References

014
National Assembly members 014